Penal populism is a media driven political process whereby politicians compete with each other to impose tougher prison sentences on offenders based on a perception that crime is out of control.  It tends to manifest in the run up to elections when political parties put forward hard-line policies which they believe the public wants, rather than evidence based policies based on their effectiveness at dealing with crime and associated social problems.

Origins
The phrase was coined in 1993 by Anthony Bottoms, when he labeled it one of the four main influences on contemporary criminal justice. It is a process that ignores or minimizes the views of criminologists, justice professionals and penal experts, claiming instead to represent the views of “the people” about the need for tougher punishment for criminal offending.

It has been theorized that the rise of penal populism has brought an increase in the repressiveness of various nation's criminal laws, including that of the UK, Canada under Prime Minister Stephen Harper, and the United States during the War on Drugs. The resurgence of penal populism in the early twenty first century lead to streams of populism flowing deeper from penal fields into mainstream society. This shift from penal to political populism was precipitated by two interconnected factors: the impact of the 2008 global fiscal crisis and the mass movement of peoples across the globe.

See also
 Carceral feminism

References

Populism
Criminology
Penology